Richel Hersisia (born April 28, 1974) is a Dutch former professional boxer who competed from 2001 to 2009. He is referred to as "The Dutch Sonny Liston" by his fans.

He once held the fringe World Boxing Foundation (WBFo) Heavyweight title, but lost it to Audley Harrison via fourth-round knockout on March 20, 2004 at Wembley Arena in London.

He last fought in September 2008, when he lost a six rounds decision to a returning Ray Mercer in Karlstad, Sweden.

Professional boxing record

|-
|align="center" colspan=8|32 Wins (25 knockouts, 7 decisions), 3 Losses (1 knockout, 2 decisions) 
|-
| align="center" style="border-style: none none solid solid; background: #e3e3e3"|Result
| align="center" style="border-style: none none solid solid; background: #e3e3e3"|Record
| align="center" style="border-style: none none solid solid; background: #e3e3e3"|Opponent
| align="center" style="border-style: none none solid solid; background: #e3e3e3"|Type
| align="center" style="border-style: none none solid solid; background: #e3e3e3"|Round
| align="center" style="border-style: none none solid solid; background: #e3e3e3"|Date
| align="center" style="border-style: none none solid solid; background: #e3e3e3"|Location
| align="center" style="border-style: none none solid solid; background: #e3e3e3"|Notes
|-align=center
|Win
|
|align=left| Frank Kary Roth
|TKO
|2
|14/11/2009
|align=left| The Hague, Netherlands
|align=left|
|-align=center
|Win
|
|align=left| Yaroslav Zavorotnyi
|UD
|8
|26/10/2009
|align=left| Amsterdam, Netherlands
|align=left|
|-align=center
|Loss
|
|align=left| Ray Mercer
|MD
|6
|05/09/2008
|align=left| Karlstad, Sweden
|align=left|
|-align=center
|Win
|
|align=left| Marcos Celestino
|TKO
|1
|29/09/2007
|align=left| Soumagne, Liège, Belgium
|align=left|
|-align=center
|Loss
|
|align=left| Taras Bydenko
|UD
|12
|30/06/2007
|align=left| Stuttgart, Germany
|align=left|
|-align=center
|Win
|
|align=left| Zurab Noniashvili
|RTD
|5
|17/03/2007
|align=left| Stuttgart, Germany
|align=left|
|-align=center
|Win
|
|align=left| Adenilson Rodrigues
|KO
|2
|28/10/2006
|align=left| Stuttgart, Germany
|align=left|
|-align=center
|Win
|
|align=left| Rogerio Lobo
|UD
|6
|14/01/2006
|align=left| Aschersleben, Germany
|align=left|
|-align=center
|Win
|
|align=left| Ioan Mihai
|KO
|2
|14/10/2005
|align=left| Struer, Denmark
|align=left|
|-align=center
|Win
|
|align=left| Vitali Shkraba
|KO
|6
|10/09/2005
|align=left| Rotterdam, Netherlands
|align=left|
|-align=center
|Win
|
|align=left| Vlado Szabo
|KO
|4
|09/06/2005
|align=left| Alcobendas, Madrid, Spain
|align=left|
|-align=center
|Win
|
|align=left| Siarhei Dychkou
|TKO
|8
|06/11/2004
|align=left| Amsterdam, Netherlands
|align=left|
|-align=center
|Win
|
|align=left| Viktor Juhasz
|KO
|1
|16/10/2004
|align=left| Halle an der Saale, Germany
|align=left|
|-align=center
|Loss
|
|align=left| Audley Harrison
|KO
|4
|20/03/2004
|align=left| Wembley Arena, London, England
|align=left|
|-align=center
|Win
|
|align=left| Zoltan Petranyi
|TKO
|1
|11/10/2003
|align=left| Willemstad, Curacao
|align=left|
|-align=center
|Win
|
|align=left| Sami Elovaara
|UD
|12
|09/08/2003
|align=left| Salzburg, Austria
|align=left|
|-align=center
|Win
|
|align=left| Sandro Abel Vazquez
|KO
|9
|16/05/2003
|align=left| The Hague, Netherlands
|align=left|
|-align=center
|Win
|
|align=left| Wojciech Bartnik
|MD
|8
|15/03/2003
|align=left| Berlin, Germany
|align=left|
|-align=center
|Win
|
|align=left| Costel Patriche
|TKO
|2
|14/02/2003
|align=left| Leeuwarden, Netherlands
|align=left|
|-align=center
|Win
|
|align=left| Eduardo Andres Sandivares
|TKO
|2
|30/11/2002
|align=left| Willemstad, Curacao
|align=left|
|-align=center
|Win
|
|align=left| Chris Sirengo
|KO
|3
|11/10/2002
|align=left| Thisted, Denmark
|align=left|
|-align=center
|Win
|
|align=left| Antoine Palatis
|UD
|8
|23/08/2002
|align=left| Skagen, Denmark
|align=left|
|-align=center
|Win
|
|align=left| Jean Francis Traore
|PTS
|6
|20/05/2002
|align=left| Roeselare, Belgium
|align=left|
|-align=center
|Win
|
|align=left| Roger Foe
|KO
|3
|02/05/2002
|align=left| Arnhem, Netherlands
|align=left|
|-align=center
|Win
|
|align=left| Istvan Kecskes
|TKO
|4
|01/04/2002
|align=left| Ghent, Belgium
|align=left|
|-align=center
|Win
|
|align=left| Marcelo Ferreira dos Santos
|KO
|4
|01/03/2002
|align=left| Give, Denmark
|align=left|
|-align=center
|Win
|
|align=left| Emmanuel Nwodo
|TKO
|3
|18/01/2002
|align=left| Thisted, Denmark
|align=left|
|-align=center
|Win
|
|align=left| Thierry Guezouli
|TKO
|3
|09/11/2001
|align=left| Odense, Denmark
|align=left|
|-align=center
|Win
|
|align=left| Cătălin Zmărăndescu
|TKO
|5
|12/10/2001
|align=left| Herning, Denmark
|align=left|
|-align=center
|Win
|
|align=left| Piotr Jurczyk
|PTS
|6
|07/07/2001
|align=left| Amsterdam, Netherlands
|align=left|
|-align=center
|Win
|
|align=left| Drazen Ordulj
|KO
|3
|09/06/2001
|align=left| Kolobrzeg, Poland
|align=left|
|-align=center
|Win
|
|align=left| Frantisek Vasak
|TKO
|2
|19/05/2001
|align=left| Cologne, Germany
|align=left|
|-align=center
|Win
|
|align=left| Boris Mamic
|TKO
|3
|20/04/2001
|align=left| Ronne, Denmark
|align=left|
|-align=center
|Win
|
|align=left| Sandor Bacsko
|KO
|1
|16/03/2001
|align=left| Lemvig, Denmark
|align=left|
|-align=center
|Win
|
|align=left| Laszlo Pataki
|TKO
|1
|25/02/2001
|align=left| Wassenaar, Netherlands
|align=left|
|}

References

External links
 

1974 births
Living people
Heavyweight boxers
Dutch Antillean male boxers
Curaçao male boxers
Dutch people of Curaçao descent
Dutch male boxers